Sanair Super Speedway is a motorsports park with a  paved triangular oval race track, a  dragstrip, a  oval, as well as a  mini-oval and  karting course. It also formerly had a  road course which has since ceased to be used. It is located in Saint-Pie, Quebec. It hosted the Molson Indy Montreal from 1984 to 1986. The dragstrip previously hosted the NHRA's Le Grandnationals Molson until Canadian fuel regulations, prohibiting leaded race fuel, forced the NHRA to quit holding a national event in the country. It currently hosts races in the American Canadian Tour Sèrie ACT Castrol.

Track history

Lap Records
The official fastest race lap records at Sanair Super Speedway are listed as:

Trans Am Series

Molson Indy Montreal winners (1984–1986)

During practice for the 1984 race, Rick Mears suffered serious foot and leg injuries after a crash on the mainstretch.
The 1985 race is known for a highly controversial finish involving Johnny Rutherford and Pancho Carter. Under safety car situation on the final lap, Rutherford led second place Carter, and appeared on his way to victory. As the field came out of the final corner, the safety car suddenly exited to pit lane, and the field unexpectedly started racing the final straightaway to the finish line. Carter got the jump on Rutherford, and edged his nose just ahead at the stripe, appearing to steal the victory. Officials deemed Carter the winner, and Carter celebrated in victory lane. Rutherford's team protested the finish because no green flag waved, and CART later restored the win to Rutherford. In most motorsport codes, when a race ends under the safety car, it exits to pit lane on the final lap and the leader crosses the line. In most North American codes, the safety car leads the field to the finish line.

NASCAR North Series

 Sanair International Speedway

 1979 (May): Beaver Dragon
 1979 (July): Robbie Crouch
 1980 (May): Bobby Dragon
 1980 (July): Bobby Dragon
 1981 (May): Robbie Crouch
 1981 (July): Dick McCabe
 1982 (May): Dick McCabe
 1982 (August): Chuck Bown

 Sanair Super Speedway

 1983: Beaver Dragon
 1984 (May): Randy LaJoie
 1984 (August): Claude Leclerc
 1985 (May): Bobby Dragon
 1985 (August): Robbie Crouch

ASA National Tour
 1987: Butch Miller

See also
 List of auto racing tracks in Canada
 Other Montreal area race tracks
 Circuit Gilles Villeneuve
 Circuit ICAR
 Circuit Mont-Tremblant
 American Canadian Tour

References

External links
Sanair Racing
Google Maps satellite image
General course descriptions
Ultimate Racing History - Sanair Super Speedway
Racing Sports Cars - Sanair - List of Races

 

Champ Car circuits
Drag racing venues in Canada
Motorsport venues in Quebec
Motocross racing venues in Canada
Paved oval racing venues in Quebec
Road racing venues in Canada
Sports venues completed in 1970
1970 establishments in Quebec